Flexibility is the anatomical  range of movement in a joint or series of joints, and length in muscles that cross the joints to induce a bending movement or motion. Flexibility varies between individuals, particularly in terms of differences in muscle length of multi-joint muscles. Flexibility in some joints can be increased to a certain degree by exercise, with stretching a common exercise component to maintain or improve flexibility.

Limberness is the condition of having flexibility to a positive or superior degree, which is also spoken of as a person having flexibility or being flexible.

Anatomical elements

Joints

The joints in a human body are surrounded by synovial membranes and articular cartilage which cover, cushion and nourish the joint and surfaces of each. Increasing muscular elasticity of the joint's range of mobility increases flexibility.

Ligaments

Ligaments are composed of two different tissues: white and yellow. The white fibrous tissues are not stretchy, but are extremely strong so that even if the bone were fractured the tissue would remain in place. The white tissue allows subjective freedom of movement. The yellow elastic tissue can be stretched considerably and return to its original length.

Tendons

Tendons are not elastic and are even less stretchy. Tendons are categorized as a connective tissue. Connective tissue supports, surrounds, and binds the muscle fibres. They contain both elastic and non-elastic tissue.

Areolar tissue

The areolar tissue is permeable and is extensively distributed throughout the body.  This tissue acts as a general binder for all other tissues.

Muscle tissue

Muscle tissue is made of a stretchy material. It is arranged in bundles of parallel fibres.

Stretch receptors
Stretch receptors have two parts: Spindle cells and Golgi tendons. Spindle cells, located in the center of a muscle, send messages for the muscle to contract. On the other hand, Golgi tendon receptors are located near the end of a muscle fiber and send messages for the muscle to relax. As these receptors are trained through continual use, stretching becomes easier. When reflexes that inhibit flexibility are released the splits then become easier to perform. The splits use the body's complete range of motion and provide a complete stretch.

Stretching

Flexibility is improved by stretching. Stretching should only be started when muscles are warm and the body temperature is raised. To be effective while stretching, force applied to the body must be held just beyond a feeling of pain and needs to be held for at least ten seconds. Increasing the range of motion creates good posture and develops proficient performance in everyday activities increasing the length of life and overall health of the individual.

Dynamic
Dynamic flexibility  is classified as the ability to complete a full range of motion of a joint. This is a release of energy with proper timing for the muscles to contract. It also controls movement as the speed increases while stretching parts of the body. This form of stretching prepares the body for physical exertion and sports performance. In the past it was the practice to undertake static stretching before exercise. Dynamic stretching increases range of movement, blood and oxygen flow to soft tissues prior to exertion. Increasingly, coaches and sports trainers are aware of the role in dynamic stretching in improving performance and reducing the risk of injury.

Static-active

Static-active stretching includes holding an extended position with just the strength of the muscles such as holding the leg in front, side or behind. Static-active flexibility requires a great deal of strength, making it the hardest to develop.

Ballistic
Ballistic stretching is separate from all other forms of stretching. It does not include stretching, but rather a bouncing motion. The actual performance of ballistic movements prevents lengthening of tissues. These movements should only be performed when the body is very warm; otherwise they can lead to injury.

Limits
Each individual is born with a particular range of motion for each joint in their body. In the 1964 book Finding Balance by Gigi Berardi, the author mentions three limiting factors: occupational demands, movement demands, and training oversights.

Internal factors

Movement demands include strength, endurance and range of motion. Training oversights occurs when the body is overused. Internally, the joints, muscles, tendons, and ligaments can affect one's flexibility. As previously mentioned, each part of the body has its own limitations and combined, the range of motion can be affected. The mental attitude of the performer during the state of motion can also affect their range.

External factors
Externally, anything from the weather outside to the age of the performer can affect flexibility. General tissues and collagen change with age influencing the individual.As one ages, performing activities of daily living without pain becomes much harder. By stretching often, one can maintain a level of musculoskeletal fitness that will keep them feeling well.

 Performers should be aware of over-stretching. Even basic things such as clothing and equipment can affect a performance. Dance surfaces and lack of proper shoes can also affect a performer's ability to perform at their best.

Signs of injury
Stretching for too long or too much can give way to an injury. For most activities, the normal range of motion is more than adequate. Any sudden movements or going too fast can cause a muscle to tighten. This leads to extreme pain and the performer should let the muscle relax by resting.

Risk of injury

Some people get injuries while doing yoga and aerobics  so one needs to be careful while doing it. While most stretching does not cause injury, it is said that quick, ballistic stretching can if it is done incorrectly. If a bone, muscle or any other part is stretched more than its capacity it may lead to dislocation or muscle pulls.

See also
Dance
Exercise
Physical fitness

References

Bibliography
Arnheim, Daniel D. Dance Injuries: Their Prevention And Care. 3rd ed. Princeton, NJ: Princeton Book Company, 1991. Print.
Ashley, Linda. Essential Guide to Dance. 2nd ed. London: Hodder & Stoughton, 2004. Print. .
Barratt, Marcia, et al. Foundations For Movement. Dubuque, IA: Wm. C. Brown Co., 1964. Print.
Berardi, Gigi. Finding Balance. 2nd ed. Routledge, NY: Routledge, 2005. Print. .
Blakey, W P. Stretching Without Pain. Canada: Twin Eagles Educational & Healing Institute, 1994. Print. .
Como, William. Raoul Gelabert's anatomy for the dancer with exercises to improve technique and prevent injuries. New York: Danad, 1964; 51-57. .
Dilmen, Nevit. Stretching. 2009. Own Work. Wikimedia Commons. Web. 4 Dec. 2010.
Franklin, Eric N. Conditioning for Dance. Champaign, IL: Human Kinetics, 2004. Print.
FvS. Split, gymnastics. 2005. Own Work. Wikimedia Commons. Web. 4 Dec. 2010.
Liedarback, "General considerations," p. 59.
McCharles, Rick. Gymnast jumping on beam. 2008. https://www.flickr.com/photos/71035721@N00/2972933329. Wikimedia Commons. Web. 4 Dec. 2010.
Pare, Caroline. Caroline Zhang in 2008 Skate Canada International. 2008. https://web.archive.org/web/20120724082853/http://everythingskating.com/. Wikimedia Commons. Web. 4 Dec. 2010.
Reinking, Ann, and Linda Szmyd. The Dancer's Workout. London: Bantam Books, 1984. Print.
Ryan, Allan J., and Robert E. Stephens, eds. The Healthy Dancer: Dance Medicine for Dancers. Princeton, NJ: Princeton Book Company, 1987. Print.
Stuart Wright, Dancer's Guide to Injuries of the Lower Extremity (New York: Cornwall Books, 1985), p. 14.
Swischuk, Leornard E. "Doing the Splits: Heard A Pop--Cannot Walk." Pediatric Emergency Care 23.11 (2007): 842-3. Web. 8 Sep. 2010. <http://ovidsp.tx.ovid.com>.

External links
NYU on Hip injuries 
Mayo Clinic on Stretching
How to stretch
About.com on Front Splits

Joints
Flexibility